Novoalexandrovka is a rural locality (a selo) and the administrative center of Novoalexandrovskoye Rural Settlement, Rovensky District, Belgorod Oblast, Russia. The population was 1,183 as of 2010. There are 6 streets.

Geography 
Novoalexandrovka is located 32 km north of Rovenki (the district's administrative centre) by road. Rovny is the nearest rural locality.

References 

Rural localities in Rovensky District, Belgorod Oblast